Whole Living was a health and lifestyle magazine geared towards "natural health, personal growth, and well-being," a concept the publishers refer to as "whole living."  The magazine became a part of Martha Stewart Living Omnimedia in August 2004.

The magazine was originally launched as the New Age Journal in 1974. The magazine was first rebranded as Body+Soul beginning with an edition in early 2002.  In 2004, Martha Stewart Living Omnimedia acquired the magazine and other publishing assets from Thorne Communications.  The magazine became Whole Living in May 2010.

Martha Stewart Living Omnimedia has announced it intends to cease publication of Whole Living.  The final installment will be the January/February 2013 issue. A $2.5 million offer to buy the title from private equity firm OpenGate Capital fell through and no other buyers have appeared. The content from Whole Living will be included in Martha Stewart Living.

New Age Journal
New Age Journal, or New Age: The Journal for Holistic Living was an American periodical prominent in the late 20th century, and defining itself as covering topics related to the period's "New Age"; it has been succeeded, in turn, by Body & Soul. It described itself around the late 1990s as concerned with "achievement, commitment, health, creative living, and holistic nutrition".

It was founded in 1974 by Peggy Taylor and other editors of East/West Journal, and based in the Boston metropolitan area.

Makeovers

Under new editorship, it was "relaunched" in 2002 as the bi-monthly Body and Soul or Body & Soul. In 2004, it was bought by Martha Stewart's Omnimedia, which  publishes Body+Soul (presented on its cover as "whole living | body + soul") eight times per year. In 2010, the magazine was relaunched as Whole Living.

In 2000, Robert Scheer created the website New Age Journal, which states that "We are not affiliated with any magazines printed on paper."

Personnel
 David Thorne, head of owning companies from 1983 to 2004
Its editors included:
 Marc Barasch
 Jennifer L. Cook
 Jody Kolodzey
 Rex Weyler

Indexing information
(Watertown, MA).

References

External links
 Whole Living website

Magazines established in 2010
Magazines disestablished in 2013
Lifestyle magazines published in the United States
Health magazines
Defunct magazines published in the United States
Magazines published in New York City
Martha Stewart Living Omnimedia